James P. O'Donnell (December 20, 1920 – March 22, 1997) is a former Democratic member of the Pennsylvania House of Representatives.

References

Democratic Party members of the Pennsylvania House of Representatives
1920 births
1997 deaths
20th-century American politicians